Radhaa Ki Betiyaan Kuch Kar Dikhayengi is an Indian soap opera which aired on NDTV Imagine. The series was produced by DJ's a Creative Unit.

Plot 
The show narrates the story of a widow Radha, and her three capable daughters - Rohini (Meethi) who is righteous and sensible, Ragini (Ginni) who is bold and energetic, and Ruchi (Chhutki) who is meek and timid. The sisters are unlike each other and aspire for different careers but support each other through life.

The family comes to Mumbai, after a troubled phase in Meerut, and stay at Radha's friend Shefali's house. Rohini wants to be a fashion designer, Ragini wants to pursue modelling, and Ruchi wants to be an astronaut. They struggle to find their place in the big city of Mumbai.

Rohini finds herself constantly put down by her competitive colleague, even though her choices and ideas are better. Ragini lies about her financial status in her college to fit in, and is busted. Ruchi fails to get into college because of her quiet nature, but is helped by her friend Adi.

When their mother sells her jewellery to get a nice gift for a relative's wedding, the sisters enroll themselves in a dance competition, win it, and repurchase the jewellery. They also save the Roshan Villa, where they live, from auctioning away. As their previous acquaintances return, the sisters find it difficult to deal with their problems but manage to win through in the end.

Cast
 Supriya Pilgaonkar as Radhaa Sharma
 Anita Kanwal as Roshan Ammu; landlady, grandmother
 Mona Vasu as Rohini Sharma; Meethi (eldest daughter)
 Ragini Khanna as Ragini Sharma; Gini (middle daughter)
 Ratan Rajput as Ruchi Sharma; Chutki (youngest daughter)
 Apurva Agnihotri as Dr. Shekhar Kapoor, Ammu's doctor, Varun's childhood friend, Rohini's husband
  Nikhil Roy as Nikhil, Ragini's close friend and love interest
 Sanaya Irani as Sanaya, Ragini friend 
 Abhimaan Balhara as Aditya, Ruchi's love interest
 Meghna Malik as Revati, Rohini's boss, owner of Gulmohar Fashion House, Nikhil's mother
 Vinay Jain as Varun Shamsher Singh, Ammu's son
 Payal Nair as Shefali Varun Singh, Ammu's daughter-in-law, Varun's wife, Radhaa's close friend
 Mona Singh as Raunaq Makhija, Rohini's supervising designer, Dr. Shekhar's first
 Vivek Madan as Aniruddh (Ani)
 Garima Kapoor as Fatima (Fatty)
 Manish Paul as Karan, the photographer
 Amit Sareen as Gaurav
 Ridhi Dogra as Rani
 Chitz as Karan, Aditya's friend

External links 
Official Site
Radhaa Ki Betiyaan Kuch Kar Dikhayengi on Dangal Play 

Imagine TV original programming
Indian television soap operas
2008 Indian television series debuts
2009 Indian television series endings
Colors Rishtey original programming